Baron Athenry is one of the oldest titles in the Peerage of Ireland, but the date of its creation is thoroughly uncertain; each of the first four Berminghams listed below is claimed by some writers to have been Lord Athenry, but the evidence is disputed. The title appears to have been given to the de Birmingham family of Birmingham, Warks, England as a reward for their help in the Norman invasion of Ireland in 1172. Both Sir William de Birmingham, and his son Robert de Birmingham, are variously claimed to have been involved in the invasion, but it is probable that, after the invasion, William returned to his home in England and left Robert their new lands in Ireland.

Peter Bermingham was fined for not attending Parliament in 1284, and is enrolled as Lord Athenry in the Parliament of 1295. The title Earl of Louth was created in 1319 as a reward to John de Bermingham for his victory over Edward de Bruce in the Battle of Faughart in 1318.

The last Baron was created Earl of Louth in the Peerage of Ireland in 1749, but died in 1799. Since he had three daughters, the Earldom of Louth became extinct at his death; the Barony of Athenry became dormant. Part of the problem has been whether the Barony properly can descend through the female line, in which case it is in abeyance between the heirs of his daughters; or whether it passes through the male line. A descendant of the younger brother of the Richard, Lord Athenry, who died in 1645, claimed the Barony as heir male in 1827, and Thomas Denman, the Attorney General for England and Wales, agreed that he was heir male, but he was not recognized by the House of Lords. A claim by Thomas Sewell, son of the Earl of Louth's eldest daughter Elizabeth, failed on the ground that the title did not pass in the female line.

Barons Athenry (1172)
The numbering follows the second edition of the Complete Peerage, Volume 1, pages 290ff.
Robert de Bermingham (died by 1218) 	
Peter de Bermingham (died 1244)
Meyler de Bermingham, fl. 1212–1262
Piers de Bermingham, died 1307 - 1st Baron
Richard I de Bermingham, died 1322 - 2nd Baron
Thomas de Bermingham, died 1374 - 3rd Baron
Walter de Bermingham, died 1428 - 4th Baron
Thomas II de Bermingham, died 1473 - 5th Baron
Thomas III de Bermingham, died 1489 - 6th Baron
Meiler de Bermingham, died 1529 - 7th Baron
John de Bermingham, died 1547 - 8th Baron
Richard II de Bermingham, died 1580 - 9th Baron
Edmond I de Bermingham, 1540–1614 - 10th Baron
Richard III de Bermingham, 1570–1645 - 11th Baron
Edmond II de Bermingham, resigned 1641 in favour of his brother
Francis de Bermingham, died 1677 - 12th Baron
Edward de Bermingham, died 1709 - 13th Baron
Francis II de Bermingham, 1692-1750 - 14th Baron
Thomas IV de Bermingham, 1717–1799, created Earl of Louth (Second creation) in 1759

Earl of Louth; First creation (1319) 
John de Bermingham, 1st Earl of Louth (died 1329)
Richard de Bermingham, Lord Atherdee (died 1322)

Earl of Louth; Second creation (1749) 
Thomas Bermingham, 1st Earl of Louth (1717–1799)

See also
 de Birmingham family
 Birmingham surname
 Bermingham (surname)
 Birmingham, Warks, England

References

Complete Peerage, sub "Athenry".
 Bermingham: Origins and History of the Family Name – 1060 to 1830, Douglas P. Bermingham, Kildare. 2012.

1172 establishments in Europe
12th-century establishments in Ireland
Dormant baronies in the Peerage of Ireland
Noble titles created in 1172